John Russell Grisdale (born August 23, 1948) is a retired professional ice hockey player who played 250 games as a defenceman in the National Hockey League for the Toronto Maple Leafs and Vancouver Canucks. He also spent several years playing in the minor Central Hockey League, and retired in 1979.

Grisdale graduated with a Bachelor of Science in Mechanical Engineering in 1971 from Michigan Technological University where he was a three-year letterman with the Huskies men's hockey team. He had 11 goals and 41 assists for 52 points in 94 career games with the Huskies. He was inducted into the Michigan Technological University Athletics Hall of Fame in 1997.

He was the commissioner of the BCHL from 2003 to 2018, and resides in the city of Coquitlam.

Career statistics

Regular season and playoffs

References

External links

1948 births
Living people
Canadian ice hockey defencemen
Dallas Black Hawks players
Ice hockey people from Ontario
Michigan Tech Huskies men's ice hockey players
People from Thunder Bay District
Toronto Maple Leafs players
Tulsa Oilers (1964–1984) players
Undrafted National Hockey League players
Vancouver Canucks players